January 13 - Eastern Orthodox liturgical calendar - January 15

All fixed commemorations below are observed on January 27 by Eastern Orthodox Churches on the Old Calendar.

For January 14th, Orthodox Churches on the Old Calendar commemorate the Saints listed on January 1.

Feasts
 Apodosis (Leavetaking) of the Theophany of Our Lord and Savior Jesus Christ.

Saints
 Virgin-martyr Agnes, in dark solitary confinement.
 Saint Nina (Nino), Equal-to-the-Apostles, Enlightener of Georgia (335)
 Saint Joseph Analytinus of Raithu Monastery (4th century)
 The Holy Fathers slain at Mt. Sinai and Raithu (4th-5th century), including the Holy 38 Fathers slain at Mt. Sinai, and the Holy 33 Fathers slain at Raithu:
 Hieromartyrs Isaiah, Sabbas, Moses and his disciple Moses, Jeremiah, Paul, Adam, Sergius, Domnus, Proclus, Hypatius, Isaac, Macarius, Mark, Benjamin, Eusebius, Elias, and others.
 Saint Theodoulos, son of St. Nilus of Sinai (5th century)
 Venerable Stephen, Abbot of Chenolakkos Monastery in Triglia, near Chalcedon (716)

Pre-Schism Western saints
 Saint Felix of Nola, a presbyter at Nola near Naples in Italy, sometimes referred to as a martyr (c. 250) 
 Saint Euphrasius, a bishop martyred in North Africa by the Arian Vandals.
 Saint Dacius (Datius), Bishop of Milan (552) 
 Saint Kentigern (Kentigern Mungo, Kentigern of Glasgow), first Bishop of Strathclyde (Glasgow), Scotland (614)  (see also January 13 - Greek and West)

Post-Schism Orthodox saints
 Saint Sava I, Enlightener and First Archbishop of Serbia (1235)  (see also January 12 )
 Saint Joannicius of Tarnovo, Metropolitan of Tarnovo in Bulgaria (13th century)
 Saint Acacius, Bishop of Tver (1567)  (see also June 29 )
 Saint Meletius (Yakimov), Bishop of Ryazan, Missionary to Yakutia (1900) 
 New Hiero-Confessor John (Kevroletin), Hiero-Schemamonk, of Verkhoturye (1961)

New martyrs and confessors
 New Martyrs slain at Raithu Monastery near Kazan (c. 1933)
 New Martyr Ambrose (Gudko), Bishop of Sarapul and Yelabug (1918)

Other commemorations
 Repose of Nicholas Motovilov (1879), disciple of St. Seraphim of Sarov.
 Repose of Hieromonk Cosmas of Grigoriou, Missionary to Zaire (1989)

Icon gallery

Notes

References

Sources
 January 14/January 27. Orthodox Calendar (PRAVOSLAVIE.RU).
 January 27 / January 14. HOLY TRINITY RUSSIAN ORTHODOX CHURCH (A parish of the Patriarchate of Moscow).
 January 14. OCA - The Lives of the Saints.
 The Autonomous Orthodox Metropolia of Western Europe and the Americas (ROCOR). St. Hilarion Calendar of Saints for the year of our Lord 2004. St. Hilarion Press (Austin, TX). p. 7.
 January 14. Latin Saints of the Orthodox Patriarchate of Rome.
 The Roman Martyrology. Transl. by the Archbishop of Baltimore. Last Edition, According to the Copy Printed at Rome in 1914. Revised Edition, with the Imprimatur of His Eminence Cardinal Gibbons. Baltimore: John Murphy Company, 1916. pp. 14–15.
Greek Sources
 Great Synaxaristes:  14 ΙΑΝΟΥΑΡΙΟΥ. ΜΕΓΑΣ ΣΥΝΑΞΑΡΙΣΤΗΣ.
  Συναξαριστής. 14 Ιανουαρίου. ECCLESIA.GR. (H ΕΚΚΛΗΣΙΑ ΤΗΣ ΕΛΛΑΔΟΣ). 
Russian Sources
  27 января (14 января). Православная Энциклопедия под редакцией Патриарха Московского и всея Руси Кирилла (электронная версия). (Orthodox Encyclopedia - Pravenc.ru).
  14 января (ст.ст.) 27 января 2013 (нов. ст.). Русская Православная Церковь Отдел внешних церковных связей. (DECR).

January in the Eastern Orthodox calendar